James Cumming (1879–1971) was a New Zealand trade unionist and politician.

Biography
Cumming was born in 1879 at Malvern, Canterbury. Cumming was a miner on the West Coast and in the Waikato. He was the chairman of the North Island Miners' District Council. He was an expert in tunneling and worked on the Ōrongorongo Tunnel to improve Wellington's water supply system.

In 1920 he came to Petone, Hutt Valley. He subsequently found employment as a waterfront worker and was the president of the Wellington Waterside Workers' Union for two years. Via trade unions he became active in the Labour Party and became president of the  Labour Representation Committee and was also secretary of the Labour Party's Petone branch. In 1930 he was elected a member of the Petone Borough Council.

He was a member of the New Zealand Legislative Council from 23 June 1941 to 22 June 1948; and 23 June 1948 to 31 December 1950, when the Council was abolished. He was appointed by the First Labour Government.

Cumming was also a member of the Wellington Harbour Board. He was first elected in 1947 and was to serve as a member for twelve years until 1959 representing Hutt.

Notes

References

1879 births
1971 deaths
New Zealand miners
New Zealand trade unionists
Members of the New Zealand Legislative Council
New Zealand Labour Party MLCs
Wellington Harbour Board members
Local politicians in New Zealand